Coffin Site is an archaeological site located at Greenwich in Washington County, New York, United States.  It has 90 acres and was the site of the prehistoric settlement.

It was listed on the National Register of Historic Places in 1980.

References

Archaeological sites on the National Register of Historic Places in New York (state)
Washington County, New York
National Register of Historic Places in Washington County, New York